Zahangir Alam (born May 7, 1979) is a former mayor of Gazipur City Corporation, an Awami Politician and businessman. Aligned with the Bangladesh Awami League, he was elected as second mayor of the Gazipur City Corporation in July 2018. He is the managing director of Honourable Textile Composite Ltd and Z Alam Apparels. He was the general secretary of Gazipur metropolitan Awami League until he was expelled by Awami League central working committee on 19 November 2021. The LGRD Ministry suspended Jahangir Alam on 25 November 2021 from mayor post of Gazipur City Corporation (GCC) on suspections of land grabbing.

Early life and education
Zahangir Alam was born in Gazipur District. He passed his SSC and HSC exams from Bhawal Badre Alam Govt. College. He completed graduation and post graduation from the same college. After that, he graduated with an LLB degree from the National University in Bangladesh.

Political career
In July 2018 Alam was elected as Mayor of Gazipur City Corporation as the Bangladesh Awami League candidate. In the election he earned 400,010 votes while Hasan Uddin Sarkar, managed to secure 197,611 votes. He was the former vice-president of the Bangladesh Chhatra League and vice-chairman of Gazipur Sadar Upazila.

Mayor of Gazipur City Corporation
During the 2019-20 session, Zahangir Alam announced a budget of approximately US$700 million income and US$550 million expense for Gazipur City Corporation.
While working as a mayor of Gazipur City Corporation, mayor Zahangir Alam disclosed about corruption and irregularities in the City Corporation. In May 2019 at a press briefing, he revealed that 14 employees of Gazipur City Corporation got show cause notice over corruption and irregularity charges. In July same year in another press briefing, he informed the journalists that among the 14 accused employees, 6 had been suspended, 3 had been temporarily suspended and the remaining 5 had been served show-cause notices for alleged corruption.

On 11 May 2020, Delwoar Hossain, the executive engineer of Gazipur City Corporation was murdered allegedly by his colleague. The investigation agency and Delwoar's family suspects that the  motive behind Delwoar's murder was corruption of the City Corporation projects.
Police arrested Anisur Rahman Selim, an assistant engineer of Gazipur City Corporation as a suspect of the murder case. Mayor Jahangir Alam told the Prothom Alo that he knew about the corruption of Selim but never took any measures against him. Jahangir told another news channel, Channel i that he suspected the murder could be caused because of bribe money from contractors.

On 4 October 2021, the Awami League sent a show cause notice to Alam after a video of him making controversial remarks on former President Sheikh Mujibur Rahman and the number of deaths in the Bangladesh Liberation War leaked and went viral on social media. On 19 November, he was expelled from the Awami League over the comments. Justices Mamnoon Rahman and Khandaker Diliruzzaman of High Court Division issued an order asking Alam why contempt of court proceedings should not begin against him for not obeying a 2018 court order that asked him not to disturb the property of the petitioner, Ashraf Uddin Ahmed. The Local Government Division suspended Alam from the office of mayor of Gazipur on 26 November. Eight cases were filed against him over his comments in which he was able to secure bail.

Md Tajul Islam, Minister of Local Government, Rural Development and Cooperatives, announced plans in December 2022 to return Alam to the Awami League and describing his previous expulsion as a temporary suspension. On 21 January 2023, Alam was conditionally allowed to rejoin the Awami League.

References

Living people
People from Gazipur District
Bangladeshi businesspeople
Awami League politicians
1979 births
Mayors of Gazipur